Robert Bickerdike (17 August 1843 – 28 December 1928) was a Canadian live stock shipping and insurance agent and politician.

Born in Kingston, Ontario, the son of Thomas Bickerdike, of Yorkshire, England, and Agnes Cowan, Bickerdike spent most of his life in Quebec after his father moved to Beauharnois County to farm. After acquiring an elementary education at the country school of the district, Bickerdike helped his father for some time on his farm, but at the age of seventeen moved to Montreal, shortly after arriving taking his first position away from home, that of a butcher's boy.

Ten years after he arrived in Montreal he entered into the pork packing trade for himself. He sat for several years in the St. Henri town council. In 1876 he entered the export business, then practically a new industry, and for the twenty years succeeding was one of the largest cattle exporters in Canada. He organized the Dominion Abattoir and Stock Yards Company, the Dominion Live Stock Assurance Company and the Standard Light and
Power Company. He had for a number of years represented the Marine Department of the Western Assurance Company. For many years Bickerdike had been a director of the Bank of Hochelaga, and for the fifteen years was its vice-president. He was for many years a member of the Council of the Montreal Board of Trade, and in 1896 was elected president. He was a life governor of the Montreal General Hospital.

In 1897, he was elected as the Liberal candidate in the Montréal division no. 5 electoral district in the Legislative Assembly of Quebec. In the federal general election of 1900 he resigned his seat in the Quebec Legislature and was elected to represent St. Lawrence riding in the House of Commons of Canada. He was re-elected in 1904, 1908, and 1911.

References

External links
 

1843 births
1928 deaths
Canadian people of English descent
Canadian Presbyterians
Liberal Party of Canada MPs
Members of the House of Commons of Canada from Quebec
Quebec Liberal Party MNAs
People from Kingston, Ontario
Anglophone Quebec people
Burials at Mount Royal Cemetery